The 2018 Montreux Volley Masters is the 33rd edition of the women's volleyball competition set in Montreux, Switzerland.

Participating teams

Squads

Group stage
The first 2 teams of each group qualify for the final round.
All times are Central European Summer Time (UTC+02:00).

Group A

|}

|}

Group B

|}

|}

Classification round

|}

Final round

Semifinal 

|}

3rd place

|}

Final

|}

Final standings

Awards

Most Valuable Player
  Paola Egonu
MVP's of Teams
  Gabriela Guimarães	
  Lin Li	
  Fotso Mogoung
  Lucia Bosetti
  Agnieszka Kąkolewska		
  Nataliya Goncharova
  Thays Deprati
  Cansu Özbay

References

2018
Montreux Volley Masters
Montreux Volley Masters
Montreux Volley Masters